Jean-Baptiste Tournassoud  (May 3, 1866 – January 5, 1951) was a French photographer and military officer.

Biography

Tournassoud was born May 3, 1866, in Montmerle-sur-Saône. At the end of his basic military service in 1887, Tounassoud remained with the Army and began a military career.

He was a pioneer of color photography, using autochrome plates.

Tournassoud was director of the Photographic and Cinematographic Service of the War (French: Service photographique et cinématographique de la guerre - SPCG) from October 30, 1918, to September 30, 1919.

He retired from the Army in 1920. He settled in Montmerle and remained a photographer until his death, in 1951, at the age of 84.

Tournassoud left thousands of photographs, both black-and-white and color.

Collections
Collections of his works are owned by:
Institut Lumière, Lyon
Musée des Pays de l'Ain, Bourg-en-Bresse
Musée Nicéphore-Niépce, Châlon-sur-Saône
Musée Clemenceau, Paris
Museum of the Great War, Château de Péronne, Somme, France

References

External links
 Website about Tournassoud
 Biography of Jean-Baptiste Tournassoud at Luminous-Lint
 Institut Lumière/patrimoine Lumiere/Autochrome

1866 births
1951 deaths
French photographers
French Army officers
Officiers of the Légion d'honneur
Recipients of the Croix de Guerre 1914–1918 (France)